Arena Botevgrad is an indoor arena located in Botevgrad, Bulgaria. It has a capacity of 4,500, and has been the home venue for BC Balkan Botevgrad since its opening in 2014.

History 
Arena Botevgrad was officially opened on March 29, 2014 after two years of construction in the presence of Bulgarian Prime Minister Boyko Borissov, Botevgrad's mayor Georgi Georgiev, and several government ministers. The hall cost 7.02 million Bulgarian lev, or about 3.5 million Euros to build. 

Between February 18th and 21st, 2016, the hall was host to the 2016 Bulgarian Basketball Cup Final 8 bracket, with BC Rilski Sportist claiming their first ever cup. In September 2016, Arena Botevgrad hosted the national basketball team's home games from Group E of the EuroBasket 2017 qualification.

See also
 List of indoor arenas in Bulgaria

References

External links
 Facebook page
 Project page at RS Engineering 

Indoor arenas in Bulgaria
Basketball venues in Bulgaria
Music venues in Bulgaria
Tourist attractions in Sofia Province
Music venues completed in 2014
Sports venues completed in 2014
2014 establishments in Bulgaria